Turner–LaRowe House is a historic home located at Charlottesville, Virginia. It was built in 1892, and is a two-story, Late Victorian style dwelling.  It features two one-story verandahs with a low-pitched hipped roofs, spindle frieze, and bracketed Eastlake movement posts and balustrade. A small second-story porch above the.entrance has a
matching balustrade and a pedimented gable roof.

It was listed on the National Register of Historic Places in 1983.

References

Houses on the National Register of Historic Places in Virginia
Victorian architecture in Virginia
Houses completed in 1892
Houses in Charlottesville, Virginia
National Register of Historic Places in Charlottesville, Virginia